INS Rajput was a guided-missile destroyer and the lead ship of the  of the Indian Navy. It was commissioned on 4 May 1980. It  was the first destroyer of the Indian Navy. It was built by the erstwhile USSR. Commodore (later Vice Admiral) Gulab Mohanlal Hiranandani was her first commanding officer.

Rajput served as a trial platform for the BrahMos cruise missile. The 4 P-20M inclined single launchers (2 port and 2 starboard) were replaced by 8 boxed launchers (4 port and 4 starboard) with each having ability to carry one BrahMos cruise missile. A new variant of the Prithvi-III missile was test fired from Rajput on March 2007. She is capable of attacking land targets, as well as fulfilling anti-aircraft and anti-submarine roles as a taskforce or carrier escort. Rajput tracked the Dhanush ballistic missile during a successful test in 2005.

The ship was decommissioned from service on 21 May 2021 at the Naval Dockyard in Visakhapatnam. She has participated in several important missions over the years, including Operation Aman off the coast of Sri Lanka to assist the Indian Peace Keeping Force during Srilankan Civil War,  Operation Pawan, for patrolling duties off the coast of Sri Lanka, Operation Cactus to resolve hostage situation off the Maldives, and Operation Crowsnest off Lakshadweep.

References

External links
 Rajput (Kashin II class) at Bharat Rakshak.
 Andhravilas.com news

Rajput-class destroyers
Ships built in the Soviet Union
1977 ships
Destroyers of India
Destroyers of the Cold War